Karen Balayan (born 8 July 1975) is an Armenian-Ukrainian judoka. He competed in the men's half-middleweight event at the 1996 Summer Olympics.

Achievements

References

External links

1975 births
Living people
Armenian male judoka
Ukrainian male judoka
Ukrainian people of Armenian descent
Olympic judoka of Ukraine
Judoka at the 1996 Summer Olympics